Gonostemon is a genus of plants in the Apocynaceae, first described as a genus in 1812.

Accepted species
Over 70 names have been published for species assigned to Gonostemon, most of the regarded as "unresolved," i.e., of uncertain affiliation. Only the following 3 are listed as "accepted" by the Plant List maintained by Kew Gardens in London

 Gonostemon fissirostris (Jacq.) P.V. Heath - southern Africa
 Gonostemon grandiflorus (N.E. Br.) Fisch. & C.A. Mey. ex C.A. Mey. - southern Africa
 Gonostemon rubiginosa (Nel) P.V. Heath -  Little Namaqualand

formerly included
moved to another genus (Stapelia)
 G. giganteus now  Stapelia gigantea 
 G. giganteus var. nobilis now  Stapelia nobilis 
 G. macowanii now Stapelia macowanii 
 G. parvulus now  Stapelia parvula 
 G. pulvinatus now  Stapelia pulvinata 
 G. schinzii var. angolensis now  Stapelia schinzii var. angolensis

References

Asclepiadoideae
Apocynaceae genera
Flora of Africa